Patricia Hill Collins (born May 1, 1948) is an American academic specializing in race, class, and gender. She is a distinguished university professor of sociology emerita at the University of Maryland, College Park. She is also the former head of the Department of African-American Studies at the University of Cincinnati, and a past president of the American Sociological Association (ASA). Collins was the 100th president of the ASA and the first African-American woman to hold this position.

Collins's work primarily concerns issues involving race, gender, and social inequality within the African-American community. She gained national attention for her book Black Feminist Thought, originally published in 1990.

Family background 
Patricia Hill Collins was born on May 1, 1948, in Philadelphia, Pennsylvania, the only child of two working parents living in a predominately Black, working-class neighborhood. Her father, Albert Hill, was a factory worker and a Second World War veteran, had met her mother, Eunice Hill, was a secretary in Washington, DC. Since both of Collins’ parents worked, she began attending daycare at two and a half years old. Collins’ love for reading and education came from her mother, who had always wanted to be an English teacher and attended Howard University. Unable to afford the tuition, Eunice was not able to graduate. After her daughter was born, Eunice made sure that she was exposed to literature at a young age, teaching her to read and introducing her to the public library.

Early life 
As a child, Collins found herself feeling safe and secure in her neighborhood. As she played in the streets with her friends freely, she trusted the safety of her observant community. She would spend time outside roller skating and jumping double Dutch rope on her block with her friends. She and her friends enjoyed making and singing music together. A musician, she can play the trumpet, piano, and organ. While in high school Collins worked at her church playing the organ. As she got older, Collins being to notice she was either the first, one of the few, or only African Americans and/or woman or working-class person in her communities.

Education 
Collins attended Philadelphia public schools —and even at a young age, Collins had realized that she attended a school that catered to mostly white middle-class students that were in a predominantly Black neighborhood. During the 1950s and 1960s, when Patricia was going to school, most schools in northern cities like Philadelphia were channels for social mobility. Although they were well funded, they were not particularly easy to navigate, especially for African-Americans and people of color like Patricia. However, Patricia was part of a group of young workers who had access to educational resources and opportunities their parents did not.

Elementary School and High School 
As a child, Collins attended Frederick Douglas Elementary School. Later, she attended Philadelphia High School for Girls (known as Girls' High), which was founded in 1848 as the nation's first public high school for women. Collins was in attendance during the 1960s, which was when the process of the desegregation of schools had begun in the United States. This contributed to her growing interest in sociology, feminism, and activism for African-Americans and civil rights.

College Education
In 1965, Collins went on to pursue an undergraduate career at Brandeis University in Waltham, Massachusetts as a sociology major. She graduated cum laude with honors with a Bachelor of Arts degree in sociology in 1969.

She proceeded to earn a Master of Arts degree in Teaching (MAT) in Social Science Education from Harvard University in 1970. From 1970 to 1976, she was a teacher and curriculum specialist at St. Joseph Community School in Roxbury, Boston and two other schools. In 1984, she completed her doctorate in sociology at Brandeis University.

Career
From 1976-1980 she was the director of the Africana Center at Tufts University. Tufts University is a predominately white school, as such Collins worked to bring the academia, ideas, and culture of the Black community to the campus. Additionally, she had aimed to bring attention to issues surrounding black women.

While earning her Ph.D., Collins worked as an assistant professor at the University of Cincinnati beginning in 1982. She taught in the Department of Africana Studies for over two decades and retired in 2005 as the Charles Phelps Taft Distinguished Professor of Sociology.

In 1986, Collins published her first major article in the sociological journal Social Problems. The article focuses on how Black women have taken their marginalized placement and benefited from society’s harmful status quo. Black women have been able to creatively fight against the status quo.

In 1990, Collins published her first book, Black Feminist Thought: Knowledge, Consciousness and the Politics of Empowerment. A revised 10th-anniversary edition of the book was published in 2000 and subsequently translated into Korean in 2009, French in 2016, and Portuguese in 2019.

In 2005, Collins joined the University of Maryland's department of sociology as a distinguished university professor. Working closely with graduate students on issues such as critical race theory, intersectionality, and feminist theory, she maintains an active research agenda and continues to write books and articles in relation to social, racial, and gender issues. Her work has achieved international recognition. Collins is focused on understanding, in her own words, "How African American male and female youth's experiences with social issues of education, unemployment, popular culture and political activism articulate with global phenomena, specifically, complex social inequalities, global capitalist development, transnationalism, and political activism."

Black Feminist Thought: Knowledge, Consciousness and the Politics of Empowerment 
In 1990, Collins published Black Feminist Thought: Knowledge, Consciousness and the Politics of Empowerment, whose approach to the title topic was influenced by such figures as Angela Davis, Alice Walker and Audre Lorde. The analysis drew on a wide range of sources, including fiction, poetry, music, and oral history. Collins's work concluded with three central claims:
Oppressions of race, class, gender, sexuality, and nation are intersecting, mutually constructing systems of power. Collins utilizes the term intersectionality, coined by Kimberlé Crenshaw, to refer to this simultaneous overlapping of multiple forms of oppression as a matrix of domination.
Because black women have unique histories at the intersections of systems of power, they have created world views out of a need for self-definition and to work on behalf of social justice. Black women's specific experiences with intersecting systems of oppression provide a window into these same processes for other individuals and social groups.
Black feminist thought on race and gender came from Black communities rather than in opposition to white feminism.

In Black Feminist Thought, Collins posits how Black feminist studies highlight two very important themes. One is "how Black women's paid work is organized within intersecting oppressions of race, class, and gender." Although these women no longer work in domestic work in private homes, they continue to work at low-paying jobs in the growing service sector. Moreover, she continues, the theme that "concerns how Black women's unpaid family labor is simultaneously confining and empowering" for them is also extremely important. Collins emphasizes this point because she points out that Black women see the unpaid work of their household as a method of resistance to oppression rather than solely as a method of manipulation by men.

In an interview with Global Dialogue magazine in 2017, Collins restated the argument that she laid out in Black Feminist Thought by emphasizing the stereotypes faced by black women: "In Black Feminist Thought, I examine how African-American women confront four main stereotypes: (1) the mule, the woman who works like an animal without complaint; (2) the jezebel, the highly sexualized woman who is often depicted as a prostitute; (3) the mammy, the Black woman domestic worker whose loyalty to her employer is beyond reproach; and (4) the Black lady, the educated Black woman who has given up family life in exchange for a career".

In an interview with Oklahoma's KGOU radio station in 2017, Collins' spoke on her careful process while writing the book: "I think it was very difficult for me to come to voice around the types of work that I do because there was no space for this work,” Collins says. “We had to create the space to write black feminist thought, to talk about race, class, gender, to talk about intersectionality. And that was all part of the process of being seen as legitimate, being listened to, being clear, being respected"

Race, Class and Gender: An Anthology 
Published in 1992, Race, Class, and Gender: An Anthology was a collaboration with Margaret Andersen, in which Collins edited a compilation of essays on race, class, and gender. The book is widely recognized for shaping the field of race, class, and gender studies, as well as its related concept of intersectionality. The essays cover a variety of topics, from historical trends and their effects today, to the current media portrayal of minority groups. The tenth edition was published in 2020.

Fighting Words: Black Women and the Search for Justice 
Collins' third book Fighting Words: Black Women and the Search for Justice was published in 1998. Fighting Words focused on how Black women's knowledge examines social injustices within Black communities and wider society. Expanding on the idea of "outsiders within" from her previous book, she examines how outsiders resist the majority's perspective, while simultaneously pushing for and creating new insight into the social injustices that exist. Collins also notes how acknowledging the social theories of oppressed groups are important because their different experiences have created new angles of looking at human rights and injustice. This has not always been the case because, as she points out, "elites possess the power to legitimate the knowledge that they define as theory as being universal, normative, and ideal". '

Black Sexual Politics: African Americans, Gender, and the New Racism 
Collins's next book, Black Sexual Politics: African Americans, Gender, and the New Racism, was published in 2004 and won the Distinguished Scholarly Book Award from the American Sociological Association. This work argued that racism and heterosexism were intertwined in multiple areas of life. For example, how ideals of beauty work to oppress African-Americans males and females, whether homosexual, bisexual or heterosexual. Collins asserts that people must examine the intersection of race, class, gender, and sexuality because looking at each issue separately can cause one to miss a large part of the problem. Her argument for resisting the creation of such narrow gender roles requires action on individual and community levels as well as recognizing success in areas other than those typically respected by Americans, such as money or beauty. Collins also contends that the oppression of African Americans cannot be successfully resisted without analyzing how intersecting oppressions influence their own group, such as the treatment of women or LGBTQ people.

From Black Power to Hip Hop: Racism, Nationalism, and Feminism 
In 2006 she published From Black Power to Hip Hop: Racism, Nationalism, and Feminism, which examines the relationship between black nationalism, feminism and women in the hip-hop generation. The book is a compilation of multiple essays by her, written over multiple years, compiled into one cohesive examination of the current situation of African Americans. Collins examines contemporary structural racism, which she calls "new racism," and explores how old ideas about what racism is prevents society from recognizing and fixing the wrongdoings that persist. The author explores a range of examples, from American national identity, to motherhood, to feminine portrayal in hip-hop. Following the Civil Rights Movement, she argues, there was a "shift from color-conscious racism that relied on strict racial segregation to a seemingly colorblind racism that promised equal opportunities yet provided no lasting avenues for African American advancement".

Another Kind of Public Education: Race, Schools, the Media and Democratic Possibilities 
In 2009, Collins published Another Kind of Public Education: Race, Schools, the Media and Democratic Possibilities, in which she encourages the public to be more aware of and prevent the institutional discrimination that African-American children are experiencing today in the public education system. Collins explains that teachers have a great deal of power to be the facilitators of either discriminatory attitudes or tolerant attitudes; they are the "frontline actors negotiating the social issues of our time." Claiming that the education system is greatly influenced by the media, Collins examines racism as a system of power preventing education and democracy to reach its full potential. Within the text, she provides examples of how people, specifically teachers in the education system, can resist colorblind racism to ensure children are provided with safe classroom environments and where they can be guaranteed freedom of expression.

One of the primary concerns in her book is the importance education has in producing citizens and making sure the disenfranchised feel empowered. Within the book, Collins includes personal stories about her position as an African American child who felt “silenced in Philadelphia’s public schools” in order to further elaborate on the important role the education institution has in establishing democracy.

Other Books 
Collins co-edited with John Solomos The Handbook of Race and Ethnic Studies (2010), a book on critical race theory.

In 2012, she published On Intellectual Activism, a collection of personal essays and interviews where she explains how ideas play an important part in bringing about social change.

In 2016 and revised in 2020, Collins also published the book Intersectionality, with co-author Sirma Bilge, which discusses, in depth, the intertwined nature of social categorizations such as race, class and gender, sexuality and nation, and how these ideas create a complex web of discrimination and disadvantage in society. Taking a global perspective, topics covered include the history of intersectionality, critical education, human rights, violence, global social protest, identity politics, and women of color feminism in the United States and Brazil.

Career Honors
Collins is recognized as a social theorist, drawing from many intellectual traditions. She reconceptualizes the ideas of race, class, gender, sexuality and nationalism as interlocking systems of oppression. Her more than 40 articles and essays have been published in a wide range of fields, including philosophy, history, psychology, and most notably sociology.
Faculty of the Year Award at the University of Cincinnati (1991)
C. Wright Mills Award for the first edition of Black Feminist Thought (1991)
Distinguished Publication Award by the Association for the Women in Psychology for Black Feminist Thought (1991)
Letitia Woods Brown Memorial Book Prize by the Association of Black Women Historians for Black Feminist Thought (1991)
Award for Outstanding Service to African-American Students at the University of Cincinnati (1993)
Jessie Bernard Award by the American Sociological Association for significant scholarship in the area of Gender (1993)
Named the Charles Phelps Taft Professor of Sociology by the University of Cincinnati, making her the first-ever African American, and only the second woman, to hold this position (1996).
Emeritus Status from University of Maryland, College Park (2005)
Distinguished University Professor from University of Maryland (2006)
 American Sociological Association Distinguished Scholarly Book Award for her book Black Sexual Politics (2007)
Morris Rosenberg Award for Student Mentorship from the University of Maryland (2009)
Alumni Achievement Award from the Harvard Graduate School of Education (2011)
Joseph B. and Toby Gittler Prize her contributions to racial and ethnic relations from Brandeis University (2012)
Doctor of Humane Letters. Duquesne University. Pittsburgh, PA. 2014.
Doctor of Humane Letters. College of Wooster. Wooster, OH. 2015.
W.E.B. Du Bois Career of Distinguished Scholarship Award from American Sociological Association (2017)

Participation in American Sociological Association
Patricia Hill Collins was named an ASA (American Sociology Association) Minority Fellow in the 1980’s. She spent two years as chair of the Minority Fellowship program from 1985-1988 and chair of the ASA Task Force from 1989-1993. In 2008, she became the 100th president of the ASA and the first African-American Woman in the organization's 104-year history. She delivered her presidential address in the 2009 ASA Annual Meeting. Collins work with the ASA, "The New Politics of Community" was published in the American Sociological Review and asserts that community is a dynamic political construct that, containing a plethora of different and contradicting agendas, can be used to evaluate issues of race, sex, and gender. She describes how community can be used for social examination for a number of reasons: 
The commonality of the “language of community”, which, interchangeable with words like neighborhood, establishes community as a part of group identity 
Communities are “malleable” and easy to research 
Communities can hold many differing agendas and thus “reflect diverse and conflicting social practices” 
“the construct of community catalyzes strong, deep feelings that can move people to action,” 
“the construct of community is central to how people organize and experience social inequalities”.

Participation in Social Activism 
On October 13, 2014, Patricia Hill Collins gave a lecture at DePaul University in Chicago, IL titled, “Charting a New Course: Intersectionality and Black Activism" to a group of 182 university students as well as to other residents of Chicago. In the lecture, Collins discussed activism stereotypes as well as intersectionality and how to use intersectionality to challenge the oppression they may face. She also encouraged the audience to create coalitions and to participate in activism themselves. Additionally, Collins’ lecture allowed her audience to think critically about sociological thought and to figure out “what it means to strengthen one’s power through ideas.” During her lecture, Collins is quoted to have said the following to lines in her discussion on intersectionality and activism:

"As we look at the world we realize that. . . the country is stronger when you take from the strengths of everyone," Collins said.

“There are risks, but the rewards are substantial," Collins said.

Academic Responses
Collins' influential books on intersectionality and community have led way to many references and responses in sociological spheres. Notably, Professor Shannon Sullivan of the University of North Carolina at Charlotte penned "Community as a Political and Temporal Construct: A Response to Patricia Hill Collins" in The Pluralist. In the article, Sullivan connected the four aspects of a politically constructed community as laid out by Collins with Philosophy Professor Alfred Frankowski. While Sullivan finds Collins' "hope that a political understanding of community could enable genuine change that is not part of a changing-same pattern"  to be admirable, she contrasts this with Frankowski's assertion that the memorialization of Anti-Black violence is necessary for white-dominated communities to keep racist agendas in the past. Sullivan ultimately finds that Frankowski's pragmatist philosophy is needed for White America to successfully evaluate the communities in which echo chambers fuel racial ignorance.

References in Other Academic Spheres
Patricia Hill Collins’ work has not only been referenced and referred to heavily in sociological circles, but her assertions on intersectionality and the black female experience have also been cited in literary analysis. In 2020, Parvin Ghasemi and Samira Heidari of the Molana Institute of Higher Education in Iran published “Patricia Hill Collins’ Black Feminine Identity in Toni Morrison’s Beloved” in the Journal of African American Studies. The article describes how Beloved’s main character, a mother and former slave in the post-slavery south, epitomizes and subsequently shatters Collins’ proposed matrix of domination: “In line with Collin’s philosophy, Morrison’s novel presents a reaction to matrix of domination. In fact, the multiplicity of experience that Collin refers to can be found in the novel through the fact that readers see simultaneously the experience of being a marginalized, a murderer, a mother, a people of color, a traumatic woman, and a former slave. All these aspects help the collective experience of race disentangle itself from the structural oppression and discrimination. Though Seth is a traumatic figure, this portrayal helps to expose the true picture of a discriminatory society that produces such failing characters.”

Representation of Media 
In 2009, a video from the C-Span website titled "BookTV: Patricia Hill Collins, author "Another Kind of Public Education" Collins takes a visit to "Busboys & Poets", a restaurant/bookstore/theater located in Washington DC and provided an hour and 16 minutes-long "book talk" regarding her book Another Kind of Public Education. As the website describes the video: "Professor Collins posits that public education is heavily influenced by the media and by the continuing influence of institutional racism and she examines ways in which schools perpetuate racism and other forms of social inequality. Professor Collins also read passages from her book and responded to questions from members of the audience."

In 2012, a video from the YouTube website titled "Dr. Patricia Hill Collins Delivers 2012 Graduate Commencement Address", Collins gives the commencement address at Arcadia University on Thursday, May 17, 2012, when she received an honorary doctorate. She provides stories of her past from growing up in Philadelphia, her and her parents' struggles, and being in a school that predominately caters to middle-class white students. She also touches upon breaking her silence and how she came about using her voice as a critical instrument to make social change.

In 2014, a video from the YouTube website titled "Patricia Hill Collins at Grand Valley State University February 2014". Collins gives a talk to undergraduate students from Grand Valley State University in which she expresses her concern of mainstream colorblindness, especially focusing on issues of racial profiling (regarding African Americans) [regarding Trayvon Martin] and tackling other issues regarding race, sex, class, etc. Additionally, Collins reads mini excerpts from her book Black Feminist Thought. The website description is: "On February 26, 2014, Grand Valley State University's Office of Multicultural Affairs, Women's Center and LGBT Resource Center hosted Patricia Hill Collins as part of ongoing Intersections programming. Patricia Hill Collins presented "We Who Believe in Freedom Cannot Rest: Lessons from Black Feminism."

In 2015, a YouTube video titled "Patricia Hill Collins Keynote at 2015 Social Theory Forum @ UMass Boston". Collins visits University of Massachusetts Boston and gives a presentation regarding the sociological theory mainly focusing on intersectionality's challenges and the critical inquiries.

In 2016, Collins alongside Patricia Williams, Robin Morgan, Kate Harding, Polly Toynbee, Arwa Mahdawi, and Suzanne Moore were all asked the following panel question by The Guardian following the defeat of Hillary Clinton by Donald Trump in the 2016 United States Presidential election: “What does the US election result say about misogyny?” In her answer Collins exclaims, “I am disappointed but I will keep up the fight.” She discusses the sadness she feels for Clinton’s loss. Additionally, Collins brings one’s attention to the idea that to gain social change, Americans must remember they will deal with struggles. Collins leaves the reader on a positive note by saying she believes that America has made progress in being committed to  opportunity, equity, civility and fairness. However, she still sees a need to keep fighting to achieve a strong democracy.

On November 21, 2018, a YouTube video titled "Intersectionality and Sociology- Professor Patricia Hill Collins." Collins gives a keynote lecture at the University of Cambridge during the university’s 50 Years of Sociology conference. In this lecture she is reflecting on her sociology career as well as “discussing critically the intersectional approach and alternative knowledge projects, and returning to the core question that motivates her work: What will it take for Black people to be free?”

Legacy
While race and its accompanying social hierarchies have remained fundamental facets of sociological study, intersectional analysis and the study of collective, oppressed identities are largely attributed to Patricia Hill Collins. In Professor Gurminder Bhambra's 2015 essay "Black Thought Matters: Patricia Hill Collins and the long tradition of African American sociology", Bhambra describes how Collins not only nurtured existing schools of African American sociology but pushed the field into a new direction. On Collins' 1990 book Black Feminine Thought, Bhambra wrote: "It has been both a scholarly beacon for researchers working through shared ideas and experiences, and an intellectual grounding from which further critical work has been enabled and more voices brought into conversation. Its influence ranges across disciplinary and geographical boundaries and dismantles conventional hierarchies in the process"

Selected bibliography

Books 
Intersectionality as Critical Social Theory, Durham: Duke University Press, 2019
(co-authored with Sirma Bilge)Intersectionality, Cambridge, UK: Polity Press, 2016, 2020 
On Intellectual Activism, Philadelphia: Temple University Press, 2012
(co-edited with John Solomos) The SAGE Handbook of Race and Ethnic Studies, Los Angeles: London: SAGE, 2010
Another Kind of Public Education: Race, the Media, Schools, and Democratic Possibilities, Beacon Press, 2009
From Black Power to Hip Hop: Racism, Nationalism, and Feminism, Temple University Press, 2006
Black Sexual Politics: African Americans, Gender, and the New Racism, New York: Routledge, 2005
Fighting Words: Black Women and the Search for Justice, University of Minnesota Press, 1998
(co-edited with Margaret Andersen) Race, Class and Gender: An Anthology, 1992, 1995, 1998, 2001, 2004, 2007, 2010, 2013, 2016, 2020
Black Feminist Thought: Knowledge, Consciousness and the Politics of Empowerment, Routledge, 1990, 2000

Book chapters

Selected journal articles
 "Just Another American Story? The First Black First Family." in Qualitative Sociology 35 (2), 2012: 123–141.
 "New Commodities, New Consumers: Selling Blackness in the Global Marketplace," in Ethnicities 6 (3), 2006: 297–317.
 "Like One of the Family: Race, Ethnicity, and the Paradox of the US National Identity." in Ethnic and Racial Studies 24 (1), 2001: 3–28.
 "The Tie that Binds: Race, Gender, and U.S. Violence." in Ethnic and Racial Studies 21 (5), 1998: 918–938.
 "What's In a Name: Womanism, Black Feminism and Beyond" in Black Scholar 26 (1), 1996: 9–17.
 "The Meaning of Motherhood in Black Culture and Black Mother/Daughter Relationships" in Sage: A Scholarly Journal on Black Woman 4 (2), 1987: 4–11.
"Learning from the Outsider Within: The Sociological Significance of Black Feminist Thought" in Social Problems. 33 (6), 1986: 14–32.

See also

References

Footnotes

Works cited
Gale Group, Contemporary Authors Online, 2001 article on Patricia Hill Collins, published on Biography Resource Centre, 2005.
Feminist Authors, St James Press, 1996, article on Patricia Hill Collins. Reproduced on Biography Resource Centre, 2005.
"Patricia Hill Collins", World of Sociology, 2 volumes, Gale Group, 2001. Reproduced on Biography Resource Centre, 2005.
"Patricia Hill Collins", Directory of American Scholars 10th edition, Gale Group, 2001.
"Dr Patricia Hill Collins, Who's Who Among African-Americans 18th edition, Gale Group, 2005.
Tonya Bolden, "Review of Black Feminist Thought", in Black Enterprise, July 1992, v22, n12, p. 12(1).
Tamala M. Edwards, "The F Word", Essence, May 1999, volume 30, issue 1, p. 90.
Katherine C. Adams, review of Black Sexual Politics, Library Journal April 1, 2004, v129 i6, p. 111.
Charles Lemert, "Social Theory", The Multicultural and Classic Readings 4th Edition Westview Press, 2010.
James Farganis, Readings in Social Theory: The Classic Tradition to Post-Modernism. 7th ed.
Patricia Hill Collins and Sirma Bilge, Intersectionality, 2016.

External links

University of Maryland profile
American Sociological Association profile
Article on Fighting Words
From Black Power to Hip Hop (review)

1948 births
20th-century American non-fiction writers
20th-century American philosophers
20th-century American women writers
21st-century American non-fiction writers
21st-century American philosophers
21st-century American women writers
African-American feminists
African-American philosophers
Black studies scholars
American feminist writers
American sociologists
American women academics
American women philosophers
Brandeis University alumni
Critical race theory
Critical theorists
Feminist philosophers
Harvard Graduate School of Education alumni
Living people
Postmodern feminists
Poststructuralists
Tufts University faculty
University of Cincinnati faculty
University of Maryland, College Park faculty
University of Maryland College of Behavioral and Social Sciences people
American women sociologists
Presidents of the American Sociological Association